George Lumley Whatford (20 July 1878 – 22 November 1915) was an English cricketer.  Whatford's batting style is unknown.  He was also a British and Indian Army officer.  The son of Jack Henry Whatford and Emily Rose Whatford, he was born at Eastbourne, Sussex, and educated at Harrow School.

By 1900, Whatford was serving in the British Army as a second lieutenant in the South Staffordshire Regiment. He was still serving in the South Staffordshire Regiment as a 2nd Lieutenant in February 1902, when he transferred to the Indian Staff Corps in the British Indian Army. The following year he was serving in the 6 Madras Infantry, where he was promoted to lieutenant in that year. In 1904, Whatford made his first-class debut in cricket for Sussex against Somerset at the Recreation Ground, Bath, in the 1904 County Championship, though in a match affected by the elements, Whatford wasn't required to bat. He made a second first-class appearance in that same season against Gloucestershire at the Ashley Down Ground, Bristol. Whatford scored 8 runs in Sussex's first-innings, before he was dismissed by Henry Huggins, while in their second-innings he was run out for 13 runs.

By 1909, he was serving in the British Raj with the 66th Punjabis.  It was in this year that he was promoted to the rank of captain.
His service continued in to World War I, during which he was killed in action in the Mesopotamian campaign at the Battle of Ctesiphon on 22 November 1915.  Prior to his death he was due to be promoted to the rank of Major. No known grave exists for Whatford, though his name is commemorated on The Basra Memorial. His brother, Stuart Whatford, also fought and was killed in World War I.

References

External links
George Whatford at ESPNcricinfo
George Whatford at CricketArchive

1878 births
1915 deaths
Sportspeople from Eastbourne
People educated at Harrow School
English cricketers
Sussex cricketers
South Staffordshire Regiment officers
British Army personnel of World War I
British Indian Army officers
British military personnel killed in World War I
Military personnel from Sussex